The Caucus System, used by the New Jersey State Senate between 1949 and 1966, and again from 1968 to 1974, was a rule utilized by Republicans that no bill could advance to the Senate floor for a vote unless a majority of members of the majority caucus supported it.  Decisions were made in virtual secrecy in private party caucus meetings attended only by the Senators of the majority party,  The Caucus System is different from Senatorial Courtesy, which allowed any Senator to block a gubernatorial appointment from his or her home county.

Governor Richard J. Hughes, a Democrat elected in 1961, opposed the Caucus System, which effectively prevented a small number of Republicans Senators to join together with the Democratic minority to support any of the Governor's legislative initiatives.  After the 1961 elections, Republicans held a narrow 11-10 majority, meaning six Republican Senators had the power to blackball any bill from reach the Senate floor.  In 1962, Senator Robert C. Crane, a Republican from Union County, died of cancer at the age of 41.  His death left the Senate evenly split at ten Republicans and ten Democrats.  A 1962 Special Election to replace Crane attracted considerable statewide attention, since the winning party would then control the Senate. The Caucus System became an issue in the campaign between Republican Assemblyman Nelson Stamler and Democrat H. Roy Wheeler, who supported eliminating the rule.  Stamler won.

When Democrats won control of the State Senate in 1965, with Hughes ally John A. Lynch Sr. (D-New Brunswick) installed as the new Senate President, the Caucus System was abolished; Senatorial Courtesy was continued.  Republicans reinstated the Caucus System rule after they won back control of the Senate in 1967.

Following the 1973 Democratic landslide, where Democrats won a 29-10 majority (with one Independent), the newly elected Senate Democratic leadership—Senate President Frank J. Dodd (D-West Orange) and Majority Leader Matthew Feldman (D-Teaneck) -- moved to eliminate the Caucus System and Senatorial Courtesy rules.  The Caucus System rule ended for good, but a faction of the Democratic majority led by Senator James P. Dugan (D-Jersey City), the incumbent Democratic State Chairman, teamed with Republican Senators to continue the practice of Senatorial Courtesy.

See also 
 Senatorial Courtesy

References

New Jersey Legislature
Parliamentary procedure